Tom Gries (December 20, 1922 – January 3, 1977) was an American TV and film director, writer, and film producer.

Life and career
Gries was born in Chicago, Illinois. His mother, Ruth, later remarried to jazz musician Muggsy Spanier, who became stepfather to Ruth's sons. Educated at the Loyola Academy and Georgetown University.

Gries began working in TV in the 1950s as a writer and director. His work can be seen on such popular programs as Bronco, Wanted: Dead or Alive, The Westerner, The Rifleman, Checkmate, Cain's Hundred, East Side/West Side,  Route 66, Stoney Burke, Combat!, The Man from U.N.C.L.E., Honey West, I Spy, Mission: Impossible, and Batman among many others. Gries won Emmy Awards for his direction on East Side/West Side in 1964 and The Glass House in 1972.

In the cinema, Gries both wrote and directed the adventure film Serpent Island (1954) starring Sonny Tufts, and the Korean War film Hell's Horizon (1955) starring John Ireland. Between television directing gigs, Gries helmed The Girl in the Woods, a 1958 drama starring Forrest Tucker and Barton MacLane. 

Gries both wrote the screenplay and directed the 1959 Jack Buetel western Mustang! before concentrating his efforts exclusively on television for almost a decade. In a triumphant return to cinema, Gries wrote and directed what is generally acknowledged to be his masterpiece in either medium, the 1968 western Will Penny, which starred Charlton Heston in the title role. It was based on an episode of the TV series The Westerner that Gries wrote and directed in 1960, entitled "Line Camp".

In 1966, Gries created the popular action-adventure series The Rat Patrol. Gries wrote and directed the pilot episode, "The Chase of Fire Raid." The 1966–68 series boasts 56 thirty-minute, color episodes produced over the span of its two-season run on ABC. The series focused on the oft-overlooked North African Campaign and episodes invariably pit the ragtag Rat Patrol — a four-man Allied force led by Christopher George as Sgt. Sam Troy — against the German Afrika Korps led by Captain Hans Dietrich, played by Eric Braeden (then still using his original name Hans Gudegast).

Gries subsequently made two other films with Heston: the 1969 gridiron drama Number One and the 1970 drama The Hawaiians, which was based on James Michener's sprawling 1959 novel, Hawaii (not to be confused with the 1966 film based on a section of the same book). In 1969, Gries co-wrote and directed Jim Brown, Burt Reynolds, and Raquel Welch in the controversial western 100 Rifles.

In the early 1970s Gries directed a variety of films, from the 1970 Jason Robards and Katharine Ross May–December romance drama Fools to the 1971 science-fiction telefilm Earth II starring Gary Lockwood and Anthony Franciosa. In 1973, Gries directed the crime-thriller Lady Ice, which starred Donald Sutherland, Jennifer O'Neill, Robert Duvall and Eric Braeden. Gries, who had directed Charles Bronson in a 1961 episode of Cain's Hundred ("Dead Weight: Dave Braddock"), helmed two back-to-back Bronson films in 1975: Breakout and Breakheart Pass. 

Gries' 1970s work failed, however, to earn the critical acclaim that welcomed Will Penny. The most successful of his later projects was Helter Skelter, a 1976 TV movie based on Vincent Bugliosi's 1974 true-crime book detailing the crimes and trials of the notorious Charles Manson Family.

During post-production on his final film The Greatest (1977), a biography of boxer Muhammad Ali (in which Ali also played himself), Gries collapsed and died of a heart attack while playing tennis. He was 54 years old.

He is the father of actor and director Jon Gries (who appeared under the name Jon Francis in the film Will Penny as a child actor) and the brother of Buddy Charles a/k/a Charles Joseph Gries, who was a pop and jazz vocalist and pianist in Chicago.

Filmography
The Bushwhackers (1952) - writer
The Lusty Men (1952) - associate producer
The Unexpected (1952) (TV series) - writer
Donovan's Brain (1953) -  producer
Boston Blackie (1953) (TV series) - writer, production supervisor
Your Favorite Story (1953) (TV series) - production supervisor
The Cisco Kid (1953) (TV series) - production supervisor
Hunters of the Deep (1954) (documentary) writer, producer
Serpent Island (1954) - director, writer
King Dinosaur (1955) - writer
 Hell's Horizon (1955) - director, writer
TV Reader's Digest (1955–56) (TV series) - director, writer
Science Fiction Theatre (1955–56) (TV series) - director
Chevron Hall of Stars (1956) (TV series) - director
Sky King (1956) (TV series) - writer
Science Fiction Theatre (1956) (TV series) - writer
Cavalcade of America (1956) (TV series) - director
Wire Service (1956–57) (TV series) - director
The Adventures of McGraw (1957) (TV series) - director
Alcoa Theatre (1957) (TV series) - director
Richard Diamond, Private Detective (1957–58) (TV series) - director, writer
The Court of Last Resort (1957–58) (TV series) - director
State Trooper (1958) (TV series) - director
 Girl in the Woods (1958) - director
Tombstone Territory (1958)  (TV series) - director, writer
Target (1958) (TV series) - director
Bronco (1959) (TV series) - writer
Johnny Ringo (1959–60) (TV series) - director, writer
 Mustang! (1959) - director, writer
Wanted: Dead or Alive (1959–60) (TV series) - writer
The Man and the Challenge (1960) (TV series) - writer, director
The Westerner (1960) (TV series) - director, writer
Lock Up (1960) (TV series) - writer
The DuPont Show with June Allyson (1960) (TV series) - writer
Zane Grey Theatre (1960) (TV series) - director
Bourbon Street Beat (1960) (TV series) - writer
Dante (1961) (TV series) - writer
The Rifleman (1961) (TV series) - writer
The Barbara Stanwyck Show (1961) (TV series) - writer
The Law and Mr Jones (1961) (TV series) - director
Adventures in Paradise (1961) (TV series) - director
Checkmate (1961–62) (TV series) - director
Cain's Hundred (1961–62) (TV series) - director
The Detectives (1961–62) (TV series) - director
Death Valley Days (1962) (TV series) - writer
The Third Man (1962) (TV series) - writer
Route 66 (1962-63) (TV series) - director
Stoney Burke (1962–63) (TV series) - director
The Travels of Jamie McPheeters (1963) (TV series) - director
East Side/West Side (1963–64) (TV series) - director
Combat! (1963–65) (TV series) - director
The Reporter (1964) (TV series) - writer, director, producer
The Defenders (1964) (TV series) - director
The Doctors and the Nurses (1964) (TV series) - director
Bob Hope Presents the Chrysler Theatre (1965) (TV series) - director
For the People (1965) (TV series) - director
Kraft Suspense Theatre (1965) (TV series) - director
The Man from UNCLE (1965) (TV series) - director
The Trials of O'Brien (1965) (TV series) - director
Honey West (1965) (TV series) - director
Voyage to the Bottom of the Sea (1966) (TV series) - director
A Man Called Shenandoah (1966) (TV series) - director
Batman (1966) (TV series) - director
The Rat Patrol (1966–68) (TV series) - director, writer, creator, producer
The Monroes (1966) (TV series) - director
Mission: Impossible (1966) (TV series) - director
The Felony Squad (1966) (TV series) - director
The Rounders (1966) (TV series) - director
I Spy (1967) (TV series) - director
Garrison's Gorillas (1967) (TV series) - director
 Will Penny (1968) - director, writer
 100 Rifles (1969) - director, writer
 Number One (1969) - director
 The Hawaiians (1970) - director
 Fools (1970) - director
 Earth II (1971) (TV movie) - director
 The Glass House (1972) - director
 Journey Through Rosebud (1972) - director
Michael O'Hara the Fourth (1972) (TV movie) - writer, producer
 The Connection (1973) - director
 Call to Danger (1973) - director
 Lady Ice (1973) - director, producer
 The Migrants (1974) - director, producer
 QB VII (1974) - director
 The Healers (1974) - director
 Breakout (1975) - director
 Breakheart Pass (1975) - director
 Helter Skelter (1976) - director, producer
 Hunter (unaired 1976 pilot for 1977 series) - director, producer
 The Greatest (1977) - director

References

External links

1921 births
1977 deaths
American film directors
American television directors
Businesspeople from Chicago
Artists from Chicago
20th-century American businesspeople
Georgetown University alumni